Purnell is a name shared by:

People
 Alton Purnell (1911–1987), American pianist
 Arthur Purnell (1878–1964), architect in Melbourne, Victoria
 Benjamin Franklin Purnell (1861–1927), American preacher, House of David (commune)
 Bervin E. Purnell (1891–1972), Australian politician
 Charles Purnell (1843–1926), New Zealand soldier, journalist, lawyer, and writer
 Clyde Purnell (1877–1934), British football player
 Ella Purnell (born 1996), British actress
 Fred S. Purnell (1882–1939), American politician
 Glynn Purnell (born 1975), English chef and restaurateur
 Heather Purnell (born 1986), Canadian gymnast
 Idella Purnell (1901–1982), American author and librarian
 James Purnell (born 1970), British politician
 Jesse Purnell (1881–1966), American baseball player
 Jim Purnell (1941–2003), American football player
 John Purnell English academic administrator
 John Howard Purnell (1925–1996), Welsh chemist
 Jon Purnell, US diplomat, ambassador to Uzbekistan 
 Keg Purnell (1915–1965), American drummer
 Louis Purnell  (1920–2001) American curator and Tuskegee airman
 Lovett Purnell (born 1972), American football player
 Mark Purnell, British palaeontologist
 Marshall Purnell (born 1950), American architect
 Phil Purnell (born 1964), British football player
 Oliver Purnell (born 1953), American basketball coach
 Russ Purnell (born 1948), American football coach
 Sonia Purnell, British writer and journalist
 Thomas Richard Purnell (1847–1908), American judge
 Tony Purnell (born 1958), English businessman
 William Henry Purnell (1826–1902), American politician
 Zedekiah Johnson Purnell (1813–1882), was an African-American activist, and businessman

Places 

 Purnell, Baltimore, Maryland, United States, a neighborhood

Organizations
 Julia A. Purnell Museum
 Purnell and Sons, defunct British printing company 
 Purnell School, a girls' school in New Jersey
 Purnell (company), Swiss watch manufacturer

Other
 George Washington Purnell House
 Purnell equation

See also
Purnell House (disambiguation)